Han Chengkai (born 29 January 1998) is a Chinese badminton player. He won the boys' doubles title at the 2016 Asian and World Junior Championships. Han also part of the Chinese team that won the 2019 Tong Yun Kai and Sudirman Cups. Together with his partner Zhou Haodong, he was awarded as the 2018 Most Promising Player of the Year by the BWF. He announced his retirement at the age of 23 after competed at the National Games on 13 September 2021.

Achievements

BWF World Junior Championships 
Boys' doubles

Asian Junior Championships 
Boys' doubles

BWF World Tour (2 titles, 1 runner-up) 
The BWF World Tour, which was announced on 19 March 2017 and implemented in 2018, is a series of elite badminton tournaments sanctioned by the Badminton World Federation (BWF). The BWF World Tour is divided into levels of World Tour Finals, Super 1000, Super 750, Super 500, Super 300, and the BWF Tour Super 100.

Men's doubles

BWF Grand Prix (1 runner-up) 
The BWF Grand Prix had two levels, the Grand Prix and Grand Prix Gold. It was a series of badminton tournaments sanctioned by the Badminton World Federation (BWF) and played between 2007 and 2017.

Men's doubles

  BWF Grand Prix Gold tournament
  BWF Grand Prix tournament

References

External links 
 

1998 births
Living people
Sportspeople from Fuzhou
Badminton players from Fujian
Chinese male badminton players
21st-century Chinese people